Megalodontidae is an extinct family of bivalve molluscs that reportedly lived from the Devonian to the Jurassic period.

Nomenclature
A family of insects was also previously called "Megalodontidae", containing the sawfly genus Megalodontes. In order to remove the homonymy, that family has been renamed Megalodontesidae.

Genera
†Conchodon
†Gemmellarodus di Stefano, 1912
†Megalodon Sowerby, 1827
†Neomegalodon Guembel, 1864
†Pachyrisma
†Protomegalodon
†Pterocardia Bayan, 1874
†Quemocuomegalodon Yao et al. 2003
†Rhaetomegalodon
†Triadomegalodon Vegh-Neubrandt, 1974

References 

Bivalve families
Prehistoric mollusc families
Devonian first appearances
Jurassic extinctions
Bivalve taxonomy